Red Raven or Red Ravens may refer to:

Comics, animation, and pulp fiction
Red Raven (Marvel Comics), the name of three Marvel comic book characters, beginning with Timely Comics' Red Raven in 1940
Red Raven Comics, where the original Red Raven first appeared
Red Raven (manga), shōnen manga by Shinta Fujimoto
Red Raven, an animated character in television incarnations of the Teen Titans
Red Raven Library, an early twentieth century pirate adventure pulp magazine published by Street & Smith

Music
"Red Raven", a polka standard, with variant arrangements under the names "Red Raven Rag", "Red Raven Polka", and "Red Raven Waltz"
Red Raven Orchestra, Lawrence Duchow's polka band
"Red Raven", song by John Keane on the 1999 album Straight Away

Other
Coffeyville Red Ravens, the sports teams of Coffeyville Community College
Red Raven Magic Mirror, a 1956 adaption of the praxinoscope
Red Raven, a fashion line by Dorothy Grant
Red Raven (Middle Persian "Shar-Duly"), an ancient Türkic dynastic tribe ancestral to Prince Kül-Tegin (fl. 6th century)
Red Raven, 4K camera from Red Digital Cinema Camera Company
Red Raven Split, an American hangover cure sold 1890s – 1930